James Howard Sanderford (born October 18, 1935) is a member of the Alabama State House of Representatives. Sanderford, a conservative Republican, has represented the 20th district since 1989. The district composes most of southeast Huntsville. Sanderford won reelection to the state House for a Seventh term on June 1, 2010, with 57% of the vote.

Biography
Representative Sanderford received his B.S. Degree in Accounting from Mississippi State University where he was active with student government. After serving as an officer in the U.S. Marine Corps, Howard Sanderford became an executive with IBM and is now President of Computer Leasing Company, Inc. He and his wife Dot are active in their church, First Baptist Church of Huntsville.

Representative Sanderford has served as past President of the Huntsville Rotary Club, past Chairman of the Madison County Republican Executive Committee, past co-chairman of the Chamber of Commerce Free Enterprise Committee, past Vice President of the Metropolitan YMCA Board, and was a member of the Alabama Commission on Aerospace Sciences and the Alabama Management Improvement Program.

He is currently a board member of the Alabama Space and Rocket Center, Volunteers of America of North Alabama, YMCA, Alabama Men's Hall of Fame, and Alabama Board of Medical Scholarship Awards.

2010 election
Howard Sanderford received primary opposition by two political newcomers in his bid for a seventh term in the Alabama legislature – David Pinkleton, a 23-year-old University of Alabama in Huntsville (UAH) student and former Republican Women of Huntsville President Frances Taylor. Both Pinkleton and Taylor focused their campaigns on individual property rights in response to the Huntsville Housing Authority's move into south Huntsville. Sanderford won the June 1 primary with 57% or 5724 votes and avoided a runoff.

Committee assignments
Representative Sanderford serves on the Boards, Agencies & Commissions Committee (chair), Judiciary Committee (Vice-chair), Madison County Legislation, Sunset Committee (Co-chair), Joint Legislative State Parks Committee, and Joint Legislative Medal of Honor Committee (chair). He also serves on the Southern Legislative Committee (executive committee) and the Energy Council.

References

Sources
https://web.archive.org/web/20100316213034/http://www.legislature.state.al.us/house/representatives/housebios/hd020.html

1935 births
American businesspeople
Baptists from Mississippi
IBM employees
Republican Party members of the Alabama House of Representatives
Mississippi State University alumni
Living people
Politicians from Huntsville, Alabama
Politicians from Meridian, Mississippi
United States Marine Corps officers
21st-century American politicians
Baptists from Alabama
YMCA leaders